Dunja Prčić (born February 17, 1987) is a former Serbian female basketball player.

Personal life
Dunja is a twin sister of Serbian basketball player Iva Prčić.

External links
Profile at FIBA Europe website
Profile at eurobasket.com

1987 births
Living people
Sportspeople from Subotica
Croats of Vojvodina
Serbian expatriate basketball people in Bosnia and Herzegovina
Serbian expatriate basketball people in Croatia
Serbian women's basketball players
Shooting guards
Small forwards
ŽKK Partizan players
ŽKK Crvena zvezda players
ŽKK Spartak Subotica players
ŽKK Novi Zagreb players
ŽKK Željezničar Sarajevo players